Xenofon Markopoulos (1 January 1921 – ?), also known as "Xenos" in short, was a Greek footballer who played as a forward.

Club career
Following the events of the Asia Minor Disaster and after the settlement of his family in Kalogreza in 1922, Markopoulos started playing football at Pamvyzantinos Kalogreza. In 1938 he transferred to AEK Athens. On 3 July 1949, he played in the Cup final against Panathinaikos, at Leoforos Alexandras Stadium, where AEK won the title. He was consiedered a specialist in scoring goals with headers. He played at AEK Athens until the end of his career in 1951, at the age of just 30, winning 2 consecutive Panhellenic Championships, 3 Cups and 4 Athens FCA Championships, including the first domestic double in by a Greek club in 1939.

International career
Markopoulos played in five games with Greece and scored two goals, between 1948 and 1949. His debut took place on 23 April 1948 in Greece's first post-war match, a home friendly against Turkey.

Personal life
Markopoulos had a son named Thodoris, who also followed the career of a footballer.

Honours

AEK Athens
Panhellenic Championship: 1938–39, 1939–40
Greek Cup: 1938–39, 1948–49, 1949–50
Athens FCA League: 1940, 1946, 1947, 1950

Individual
Greek Cup top scorer: 1948–49

See also
List of one-club men in association football

References

External links

"The History of AEK", Edition "G.X. Alexandris, Athens 1996Ethnic Greece's march through time, Papazisis Publications Athens 2001National Football Team of Greece'' Christos Arvanitis

1921 births
Footballers from Istanbul
Constantinopolitan Greeks
Emigrants from the Ottoman Empire to Greece
Greece international footballers
Association football forwards
AEK Athens F.C. players
Footballers from Athens
Greek footballers